Renovell Nichel from the LIRMM-CNRS, Montpellier Cedex, Herault, France was named Fellow of the Institute of Electrical and Electronics Engineers (IEEE) in 2013 for contributions to failure analysis and to defect-oriented tests of digital and analog circuits and systems.

References 

Fellow Members of the IEEE
Living people
French electrical engineers
Year of birth missing (living people)
Place of birth missing (living people)